Motswako High School is the eighth studio album by South African hip hop artist Hip Hop Pantsula released under the Lekoko on December 31, 2014.

Track listing

 Jabbalude (featuring Complete) – 2:56
 Home (featuring Raheem DeVaughn) – 3:29
 Fall Back In Love (featuring Bucie) – 4:54
 Jigah (featuring M.anifest) – 3:28
 Trafficki (featuring Lection) – 4:05
 Mafikeng (featuring Pulse Of Joy) – [Remake] 6:25
 Billion Ke Sny (featuring Heemal Ganja) – 4:24
 Equals 6:16
 In My Life (featuring Omar EL, Kay Gee and Cassper Nyovest) – 4:31
 The Way You Are (featuring Zyon) – 5:22
 Poverty (featuring Sunglen) – 4:32
 Al'a Mmona (featuring Maz) – 1:59
 Petros 4:12
 Pop Mabhodlela (featuring Tamarsha) – 4:09
 Ke Molao (featuring Senyaka) – 3:08
 Outro (featuring Collin and Pulse Of Joy) – 2:20
 Amazing 2015 (featuring Harrison Crump, Asheru and Omar EL) – 5:09
 Toto and Gogo (Don't Forget) (featuring Anatii) – 3:33
 Nkaofa 6:12

Sources

2014 albums
Hip Hop Pantsula albums